Les Edgerton is an  American author of twenty-three books, including two about writing fiction: Finding Your Voice (Writer's Digest Books) and Hooked (Writer's Digest Books). Several of his books have been translated into Japanese, German and Italian. He also writes short stories, articles, essays, novels, and screenplays.

Awards and recognition
Edgerton's fiction has been nominated for the Pushcart Prize, O. Henry Award, Edgar Allan Poe Award (short story category), Jesse Jones Award, PEN/Faulkner Award, Derringer Award and the Violet Crown Book Award.  One of his screenplays was a semifinalist for the Don and Gee Nicholl Fellowships in Screenwriting Program, a finalist in the Austin Film Festival Heart of Film Screenplay Competition, and a finalist in the Writer's Guild's "Best American Screenplays" Competition.  His short fiction has appeared in Houghton Mifflin's Best American Mysteries of 2001, The South Carolina Review, Kansas Quarterly, Arkansas Review, North Atlantic Review, Chiron Review, and many others.

Works
Hooked: Write Fiction That Grabs Readers at Page One and Never Lets Them Go, Writer's Digest Books, 2007, 
Finding Your Voice: How to Put Personality into Your Writing, Writer's Digest Books, 2003, 
Surviving Little League: For Players, Parents, and Coaches, Taylor Trade Publishing, 2004, 
Monday's Meal: Stories, University of North Texas Press, 1997, 
The Death of Tarpons, The University of North Texas Press, 1996, 
Perfect Game USA, McFarland Publishing, 2008.
The Perfect Crime, StoneGate Ink, 2011
Just Like That, StoneGate Ink, 2011
Gumbo Ya-Ya, Story Collection, Snubnose Press, 2011
The Bitch, Bare Knuckles Press, 2011
Mirror, Mirror, YA, StoneGate Ink, 2012
Three books on business/hairstyling from Thomson Publishing.
The Rapist, New Pulp Press, 2013.

References

External links

1943 births
Living people
Writers of books about writing fiction
Indiana University South Bend alumni
People from Odessa, Texas
Writers from Fort Wayne, Indiana
Writers from South Bend, Indiana
People from Freeport, Texas